Wolfhound or Wolfhounds may refer to:

Dogs
 A dog bred or trained for wolf hunting with dogs

Specific breeds
 Bankhar Dog, a livestock guarding dog also known as the Mongolian wolfhound
 Borzoi, a sighthound dog breed formerly known as the Russian wolfhound
 Irish wolfhound, a sighthound dog breed
 Saarloos wolfdog (German: Saarlooswolfhund), a wolf-dog breed

Entertainment 
 Wolfhound (1992 film), a Soviet action film directed by Mikhail Tumanishvili
 Wolfhound (2002 film), an American film directed by Donovan Kelly and shot in Ireland
 Wolfhound (2006 film), Russian fantasy film based on the 1995 novel
 Wolfhound (novel), a 1995 Russian fantasy novel by Maria Semyonova
 Young Wolfhound, a 2006–2007 television series and prequel to the 2006 film 
 The Wolfhounds, an English noise pop group

Military 
 C-146A Wolfhound, an American variant of the Dornier 328 aircraft
 HMS Wolfhound (L56), a Royal Navy escort destroyer of World War II
 M38 Wolfhound, a 6×6 armoured car of the U.S. military
 Wolfhound (Heavy Tactical Support Vehicle), a 6×6 variant of the Cougar (MRAP)
 Wolfhounds, nickname of the 27th Infantry Regiment (United States)

Sports 
 Boston Irish Wolfhounds, an American rugby union team.
 Ireland Wolfhounds, Ireland's "A" (second-level) national rugby union team
 Limavady GAC or Limavady Wolfhounds, a Gaelic Athletic Association club
 Wolfhounds, nickname of the Ireland national rugby league team

Other uses 
 Wolfhound (horse) (1989–2009), a Thoroughbred racehorse
 Wolfhound, a planned enlargement of the Armstrong Siddeley Deerhound aero-engine

See also
 
 Wolfdog, a wolf-dog hybrid